Chokak Hamam ("fallen bath") is a historical bath near Juma Mosque in Ganja.

About 
Chokak Hamam was built in Ganja in 1606 under a project of architect Bahāʾ al-dīn al-ʿĀmilī (also known as Sheikh Baha'i). Clay and lime mix and red bricks were used in the construction of the building. It has a large and two small domes. In 2003 it was repaired by the Repair Department of the Ministry of Culture.

The building is a decorative art center. Since 2014, the bathhouse operates as a bath for one of the hotels in Ganja.

Gallery

See also 
 Juma Mosque
 Tomb of Javad khan
 Tourist attractions in Ganja

References

Bathrooms
History of Ganja, Azerbaijan
Buildings and structures in Ganja, Azerbaijan
Safavid architecture
Baths of Azerbaijan